The 2021 Chevrolet Silverado 250 was a  NASCAR Camping World Truck Series race that was held on October 2, 2021, at Talladega Superspeedway in Lincoln, Alabama. Contested over 99 laps—extended from 94 laps due to an overtime finish—on the  asphalt superspeedway, it was the 20th race of the 2021 NASCAR Camping World Truck Series season, the fifth race of the Playoffs, and the second race of the Round of 8. In a wild finish that saw numerous lead changes, Tate Fogleman and John Hunter Nemechek would collide, with Nemechek spinning. Fogleman would then hold off the charging Tyler Hill on the final lap to collect his first career Truck series victory.

Report

Background
Talladega Superspeedway, originally known as Alabama International Motor Superspeedway (AIMS), is a motorsports complex located north of Talladega, Alabama. It is located on the former Anniston Air Force Base in the small city of Lincoln. The track is a tri-oval and was constructed in the 1960s by the International Speedway Corporation, a business controlled by the France family. Talladega is most known for its steep banking and the unique location of the start/finish line that's located just past the exit to pit road. The track currently hosts the NASCAR series such as the NASCAR Cup Series, Xfinity Series and the Camping World Truck Series. Talladega is the longest NASCAR oval with a length of  tri-oval like the Daytona International Speedway, which also is a  tri-oval.

Entry list 

 (R) denotes rookie driver.
 (i) denotes driver who is ineligible for series driver points.

Qualifying
Ben Rhodes was awarded the pole for the race as determined by competition-based formula.

Starting Lineup

Race

Race results

Stage Results 
Stage One
Laps: 20

Stage Two
Laps: 20

Final Stage Results 

Laps: 54

Race statistics 

 Lead changes: 23 among 12 different drivers
 Cautions/Laps: 6 for 29
 Time of race: 2 hours, 6 minutes, and 17 seconds
 Average speed:

References 

2021 NASCAR Camping World Truck Series
NASCAR races at Talladega Superspeedway
2021 in sports in Alabama
Chevrolet Silverado 250